Filarmonico Kraken is the name of a live album by Colombian group Kraken It was released on December 15, 2007 by Athena Productions.

Information 
This album brings a total of thirteen songs. With songs like Vestido de Cristal, Frágil al Viento, Amnesia and America. This album was recorded with the Bogotá Philharmonic Orchestra.

Track listing

References 

Kraken (band) albums
2007 albums